Ripak-e Lal Mohammad (also Romanized as Rīpak-e Lāl Moḩammad) is a village in Negur Rural District, Dashtiari District, Chabahar County, Sistan and Baluchestan Province, Iran. At the 2006 census, its population was 129, in 21 families.

References 

Populated places in Chabahar County